Chivito is the national dish of Uruguay. It is a sandwich of sliced beefsteak (churrasco), mozzarella, ham, tomatoes, mayonnaise and black or green olives. A chivito commonly also includes bacon and fried or hard-boiled eggs. It is served in a bun, often accompanied by French-fried potatoes. Other ingredients, such as red beets, peas, grilled or pan-fried red peppers, and slices of cucumber, may be added.

In Argentine cuisine a similar sandwich  is called lomito.

History
Chivito is the diminutive of chivo, goat, and means kid (young goat). In neighboring Argentina, chivito, barbecued kid, is a popular asado dish; it is reported that the Uruguayan chivito arose in Punta del Este, Uruguay, at a restaurant called "El Mejillón Bar" in 1946, when a woman from Argentina ordered a sandwich of chivito for a hurried meal, expecting kid. The restaurant owner, Antonio Carbonaro, did not have this meat and used beef fillet steak instead.

Variations
The Canadian Chivito (in Spanish chivito canadiense) is a variation of the sandwich, with the addition of panceta.

The chivito can be served as a platter rather than a sandwich (chivito al plato). It is usually served with Russian salad or French fries.

See also

 List of sandwiches
 Roast beef sandwich

References

External links

Uruguayan cuisine
National dishes
Bacon sandwiches
Cheese sandwiches
Egg sandwiches
Uruguayan inventions
Olive dishes
Beef steak dishes
Beef sandwiches